Bridgeville can refer to:

 Bridgeville, California, unincorporated town in Humboldt County, California, known for being the first town to be sold on eBay
 Bridgeville, Delaware, town in Sussex County, Delaware
 Bridgeville, Kentucky, an unincorporated community
 Bridgeville, New York, hamlet in Sullivan County, New York
 Bridgeville, Nova Scotia, in Pictou County
 Bridgeville, Ohio, an unincorporated community
 Bridgeville, Pennsylvania, borough in Allegheny County, Pennsylvania
 former name of Elba, Alabama, city in Coffee County, Alabama